Bridgewater station is a historic train station located at Bridgewater in Oneida County, New York. It was built in 1901 and is a one-story, rectangular, timber frame building 20 feet by 91 feet.  It was built by the short line Unadilla Valley Railway and also served the separate line of the Delaware, Lackawanna and Western Railroad branch to Richfield Springs, New York  It ceased use as a station in 1960 and is now home to the Bridgewater Historical Society.

It was listed on the National Register of Historic Places in 2006 as the Bridgewater Railroad Station.

References

Railway stations on the National Register of Historic Places in New York (state)
Railway stations in the United States opened in 1901
Transportation buildings and structures in Oneida County, New York
Former Delaware, Lackawanna and Western Railroad stations
National Register of Historic Places in Oneida County, New York